This article shows matches of the South Korea national football B team.

Reserve matches 

The following matches are international matches against national reserve teams (including under-23 teams before the 1992 Summer Olympics) or league selections.

1960s

1970s

1980s

1990s

2000s

2010s

University matches

1970s

1980s

1990s

2000s

2010s

2020s

Other international matches

1960s

1970s

1980s

1990s

Non-international matches

The following matches are non-international matches against allied teams, regional teams, or clubs.

1960s

1970s

1980s

1990s

Domestic matches 
The following matches were played between South Korean teams.

See also
 South Korea national football B team
 South Korea national football team results
 South Korea national football team results (unofficial matches)

Notes

References

South Korea national football B team
South Korea national football team results
Lists of national association football team unofficial results